A shock wave is a type of propagating disturbance in a fluid, gas, or plasma medium.

Shockwave may also refer to:

Amusement rides
 Shock Wave (Brean Leisure Park), a looping roller coaster
 Shockwave (Canada's Wonderland), a thrill ride at Canada's Wonderland
 Shockwave (Dreamworld), a Zamperla Disk'O at Dreamworld
 Shockwave (Kings Dominion), a former stand-up roller coaster at Kings Dominion
 Shockwave (Six Flags Great America), a large defunct roller coaster manufactured by Arrow Dynamics at Six Flags Great America in Gurnee
 Shock Wave (Six Flags Over Texas), a roller coaster at the amusement park Six Flags Over Texas
 Shockwave (Drayton Manor), a roller coaster at Drayton Manor Theme Park
 Batman The Escape, a stand-up roller coaster known as Shockwave at Six Flags Magic Mountain and Six Flags Great Adventure

Books and comics
 List_of_metahumans_in_DC_Comics#S, Shockwave a comic book character in DC Comics
 Shockwave (comics), a comic book character in Marvel Comics 
 Shockwave (G.I. Joe), a 1988 toy/action figure (and later comic book character)
 Shockwave (Transformers), a comic book character
 Shock Wave (novel), a 1996 novel written by Clive Cussler
 Shockwave, the novelization of the Star Trek: Enterprise episode, see List of Star Trek: Enterprise novels
 "Shockwave", a title in the 2013 audiobook series Doctor Who: Destiny of the Doctor

Film and television
 Shock Wave (film), a 2017 Hong Kong action film
 Shock Waves (film), a horror movie from 1977 directed by Ken Wiederhorn
 Shockwave, Darkside, 2007 science fiction film
 "Shockwave" (Star Trek: Enterprise), a 2002 episode of Star Trek: Enterprise
 Shockwave (TV series), a documentary distributed by The History Channel
 NWA Shockwave (TV program), a professional wrestling series

Games and amusements
 Shockwave Productions,Inc., the former trade name of the video game company A2A Simulations
 Shockwave (game portal), a digital video game distributor and portal
 Shockwave (video game), a 1990 puzzle game developed and published by American Game Cartridges
 Shockwave Assault, a 1994 3D shooter by Electronic Arts also released under the title Shock Wave

Music

Albums
 Shock Waves (Leather Leone album), 1989
 Shock Waves (Vow Wow album), 1986
 Shockwave, an album by Decoded Feedback, 2003
 Shockwave, an album by Marshmello, 2021
 Shockwaves, an album by Unkle Bob, 2010

Songs
 "Shockwave" (Black Tide song), 2007
 "Shockwave" (Liam Gallagher song), 2019
 "Shockwaves", a song by Diana Ross from her 1987 album Red Hot Rhythm & Blues
 "Shock Wave", a song by Black Sabbath from the 1978 album Never Say Die!

People
 Chris "Shockwave" Sullivan, American actor and vocal percussionist

Sports
 San Diego Shockwave, a 2007 expansion team from the National Indoor Football League
 Shockwave (2000 yacht), a sailing yacht that sank during a 2009 race off New South Wales, Australia
 Shockwave (2002 yacht), a 2002 sailing yacht
 Shockwave (2008 yacht), a 2008 sailing yacht
 Shockwave (Jet Truck), a family of jet-powered trucks
 NWA Shockwave, a defunct professional wrestling promotion

Technology
 Adobe Shockwave, a multimedia platform for building interactive applications